Matt Browne (born 1942 in Enniscorthy, County Wexford, Ireland) was an Irish sportsperson.  He played hurling with his local club Enniscorthy Shamrocks and was a member of the Wexford senior inter-county team from 1969 until 1972.

References

1942 births
Living people
Enniscorthy Shamrocks hurlers
Wexford inter-county hurlers